Mafia is the first EP by Italian technical death metal band Fleshgod Apocalypse. The album was released on May 18, 2010, through Willowtip Records. It was recorded, mixed, mastered and produced by Stefano "Saul" Morabito.

Track listing

Personnel 
Tommaso Riccardi - lead vocals, rhythm guitar
Cristiano Trionfera - lead guitar, backing vocals
Paolo Rossi - bass, clean vocals
Francesco Paoli - drums, additional guitars

References 

2010 debut EPs
Fleshgod Apocalypse albums
Willowtip Records EPs